Samir Singh (born March 4, 1971) is a Democratic politician from Michigan who serves in the Michigan Senate. He formerly served as a member of the East Lansing City Council and was one of the state's youngest city council members when he joined at age 24. Additionally, he served as mayor of the city for one term and was the first person of color to hold that position. He is a past president of the Michigan Nonprofit Association. In November 2016, Singh was selected by his House Democratic colleagues to serve as Minority Leader for the 2017-18 session. In the 2022 election, Singh was elected to the Michigan Senate, where he currently represents the 28th district.

References

1971 births
21st-century American politicians
American mayors of Indian descent
American politicians of Indian descent
Asian-American people in Michigan politics
Living people
Mayors of East Lansing, Michigan
Democratic Party members of the Michigan House of Representatives
Democratic Party Michigan state senators
Michigan city council members
Michigan State University alumni